Alberto Gerchunoff (January 1, 1883 – March 2, 1950), was an Argentine writer born in the Russian Empire, in the city of Proskuriv, now Khmelnytskyi, Ukraine.

Biography
His family emigrated in 1889 to the Argentinian Jewish agricultural colony of Moïseville, now Moisés Ville, Santa Fe. His father, Rab Gershon ben Abraham Gerchunoff was murdered by a gaucho on February 12, 1891. After a few months the family moved to Rajil, another Jewish settlement near Villaguay, Entre Ríos. The colony was founded by philanthropist Baron Maurice de Hirsch as a haven for Jews fleeing the pogroms of Europe. Later, he lived in Argentina's capital, Buenos Aires. Jorge Luis Borges described him thus:

He was an indisputable writer, but his reputation transcends that of a man of letters. Unintentionally and perhaps unwittingly, he embodied an older type of writer ... who saw the written word as a mere stand-in for the oral, not as a sacred object.

Although he worked primarily as a journalist for Argentina's leading newspaper La Nación, he also wrote many important novels and books on Jewish life in Latin America, including The Jewish Gauchos of the Pampas, which was produced into a movie in 1975.

For most of his life Gerchunoff espoused assimilationism for the Jews of Argentina, though altered his stance with the rise of Hitler, eventually advocating for the establishment of the state of Israel before the United Nations in 1947. He is said to have collaborated with Wilhelm Reich on a version of his orgone box designed to preserve the core of Jewish cultural memories, many of which were collected by him as oral histories and published under the title Héroes de los Intersticios in 1948.

See also
 Jewish gauchos
 Jewish Colonization Association

References

Further reading
Argentina's Jewish Short Story Writers, Rita M. Gardiol, 1986.

1883 births
1949 deaths
People from Santa Fe, Argentina
Ukrainian Jews
Emigrants from the Russian Empire to Argentina
Naturalized citizens of Argentina
Argentine people of Ukrainian-Jewish descent
Jewish Argentine writers
Argentine journalists
Male journalists
20th-century journalists

Argentine male writers
Argentine novelists